Ali Hashemi ( born 1 November 1991) is an Iranian weightlifter, Olympian, and two time World Champion competing in the 94 kg, and 105 kg category until 2018 and 102 kg starting in 2018 after the International Weightlifting Federation reorganized the categories.

Career
He won the bronze medal in the Men's 94 kg weight class at the 2015 Asian Weightlifting Championships.

Major results

References

External links

 
 
 

Living people
1991 births
Iranian male weightlifters
Iranian strength athletes
Weightlifters at the 2016 Summer Olympics
Olympic weightlifters of Iran
World Weightlifting Championships medalists
Asian Games medalists in weightlifting
Asian Games bronze medalists for Iran
Weightlifters at the 2018 Asian Games
Medalists at the 2018 Asian Games
People from Ilam Province
Weightlifters at the 2020 Summer Olympics
21st-century Iranian people